The Peggy Notebaert Nature Museum is a natural history museum located in Chicago, Illinois, and operated by the Chicago Academy of Sciences. The museum traces its history to the founding of the academy in 1857.  After a century at a nearby location, the academy opened its present museum named for benefactor Peggy Notebaert in 1999 at the intersection of Fullerton Parkway and Cannon Drive in Lincoln Park. The institution focuses on the natural history of the Chicago region, and offers educational programs for children and adults.  It is also known for its live butterfly house, which is attached to a laboratory and program to study and enhance Chicago area butterfly populations.

History
The Chicago Academy of Sciences had previously been located at Lincoln Park's century-old Matthew Laflin Memorial Building. 
The academy was founded in 1857 by young prominent American naturalists, such as Robert Kennicott and William Stimpson.  It was Chicago's first museum dedicated to nature and science, and developed one of the finest natural history collections in the United States in the mid-19th century, but that collection was lost  in the Great Chicago Fire of 1871.  The museum was rebuilt but lost its home again in the financial turmoil of the 1880s.

The academy then built a museum building in Lincoln Park in 1898, which became the model for the Chicago Park District's museum-in-the-parks program.  The old museum attracted many visitors with its naturalistic dioramas of area ecological settings.  After outgrowing the Laflin Building, a new home for the academy was constructed nearby, on the southeastern banks of the North Pond.  Its old building is currently used for Lincoln Park Zoo administration.

Exhibits and programs
The original series of long-term exhibitions and botanic recreations around the building – including Butterfly Haven, City Science house, Water Lab and Wilderness Walk habitat exhibits – were developed by a team of academy staff, led by Paul G. Heltne, Kevin Coffee, and Douglas Taron, and designed by Lee H. Skolnick Design + Architecture Partnership with Carol Naughton Associates

The museum's exhibits today include displays about the ecological history of the Illinois region, a live butterfly house, and a green home demonstration. The butterfly house features more than 200 species of native and exotic butterflies. One of the museum's ongoing scientific efforts is the study, care, and breeding of native butterflies for species population support in the Chicago area. The museum also offers more than 100 educational programs in the natural sciences for adults and children.

Name
The museum building is named in honor of benefactor Peggy Notebaert, wife of then Qwest Communications chairman and chief executive officer Richard Notebaert. The building was designed by Perkins and Will.

See also

 List of museums and cultural institutions in Chicago

References

External links 
 Official site
 Chicago Academy of Sciences / Peggy Notebaert Nature Museum on Google Cultural Institute
 Chicago Academy of Sciences' Virtual Exhibit: The Laflin Building Nature Dioramas

Museums in Chicago
Natural history museums in Illinois
1857 establishments in Illinois